The AN/MPN is a mobile Ground-controlled approach radar first used during World War II. "MPN" is Joint Electronics Type Designation System nomenclature for (Ground) Mobile (M), Pulsed (P), Navigation aid (N).

Variations
 AN/MPN-1 was used to assist the process of directing aircraft over a predetermined glide path for safe approach to an aerodrome runway under conditions approaching zero visibility. A  V-8 truck contains the system's two PE-127 power units (rated output of each 7.5 KW), one air conditioner unit, and equipment spare parts. An additional diesel generator was usually mounted on a bomb trailer and towed behind the radar trailer. The V-2 trailer contains the system's radar and communications sets. High Frequency (HF) and Very High Frequency (VHF) communications were provided by the SCR-274 transmitter, and BC-342 receivers. Ultra High Frequency (UHF) communications were added later via tactical radios normally jeep mounted for use by forward air controllers.

 AN/MPN-2 was a mobile radar beacon which provided navigational aid and homing facilities for aircraft. Its major components, AN/CPN-6, and AN/CPN-8, were mounted in a trailer van.
 AN/MPN-3 is similar to the MPN-1A except that it had single, rather than dual radar sets for each channel, improved mobility because of decreased weight, fewer communications channels, and reduced number of personnel.
 AN/MPN-5
 AN/MPN-8
 AN/MPN-11 was a mobile (trailer-mounted) version of the AN/CPN-4 GCA unit. The CPN-4 was the follow-on replacement for the MPN-1. It contained newer, more powerful radars, better radios including UHF as standard and power-operated slewing of the precision approach radar (PAR) antennas. The horizontal and vertical radar presentations were contained on a single CRT screen. If necessary, a single operator could perform all of the GCA functions. (CPN stands for air-transportable "Cargo" Radar for Navigation.) The entire CPN-4 unit could be broken down into air-transportable pieces.)
 AN/MPN-14 Mobile Ground Approach System can be configured as a complete Radar Approach Control (RAPCON) or Ground Controlled Approach (GCA) facility. The radar unit is used by air traffic controllers to identify, sequence, and separate participating aircraft, provide final approach guidance through air defense corridors and zones, and coordinate ID and intent with local air defense units at assigned airports and air bases. These services can be provided in all types of weather. It is capable of identifying aircraft using secondary radar up to a 200-nautical-mile (370 km) radius and primary radar coverage to 60 nautical miles (110 km). Both the PAR and ASR can be used as final approach aids. The unit has three ASR display indicators and one PAR indicator located in the operations shelter, and one each ASR and PAR indicator located in the maintenance shelter. Complete operations are conducted from the operations trailer. The system is limited to a single runway but has the capability of providing opposite direction runway operations with the aid of a transportable turntable.
AN/MPN-14K Mobile Ground Approach System
 AN/MPN-25 ITT product that scans the PAR coverage area and capable of scanning 360 degree using the same antenna.  The system then process the raw target data to form a data word sending it to a computer display operating on Solaris.  It is a  asr coverage and  PAR coverage.  The system can operate in three different modes to include ASR, PAR and Combined mode.  In ASR the azimuth antenna spins at 60 RPMs and used only to process targets typical to any ASR and also utilizes the AN/TPX-56 to process IFF targets.  Both raw returns and IFF are processed in the tracker.  In PAR mode the azimuth antenna does not spin and fixed normally on the reciprocal runway heading to pickup targets in azimuth and elevation planes to process typical PAR targets. In combined mode the azimuth antenna spins at 60 RPM's to provide the 1 second ICAO update rate to the PAR display. The antenna arrays consist of Trans Receive Modules (TR) modules that are calibrated for phase and power to allow formation of the RF beam in space.  The display software has two modes of operation ASR/PAR. The PAR display utilizes ITT software and the ASR software is a derivative of BDM software used at several ranges.    
 AN/MPN-26 A program that was never accepted by the government.  
Earlier radars included the AN-FPN-36 "Quad Radar", a compact and portable system that could function as either an airport surveillance radar, GCA radar, non-precision ASR approach radar, or airport surface detection equipment, and the AN-CPN-4, a larger, more modern and precise system that provided those functions. The AN/MPN-26 program was cancelled in 2008.

See also
 List of U.S. Signal Corps vehicles
 Joint Electronics Type Designation System
 Rebecca/Eureka transponding radar
 Precision approach radar
 LORAN

References
 TM 11-1343 AN/MPN-1 technical operations manual dated July 1944
 TM 11-487-C1 military standardization handbook dated 1965

External links
 https://books.google.com/books?id=FHi5wRMtQ2QC&pg=PA147&dq=AN/MPN-1+RADAR&as_brr=3&ei=epaUSbbSJ4uYMobf8KQJ
 https://books.google.com/books?id=wpFMWeLmp4cC&pg=PA193&dq=AN/MPN-1+RADAR&ei=c4yUSY2wIpbAM8ig9aQJ#PPA193,M1
 http://www.mobileradar.org/radar_descptn_1.html#mpn_1
 https://web.archive.org/web/20090227032458/http://www.tpub.com/content/radar/TM-11-487C-1/index.htm
 http://www.globalsecurity.org/military/library/news/2002/08/mil-020821-usaf02.htm  mpn-25

World War II radars
Military radars of the United States
World War II American electronics
Radars of the United States Air Force
Military radio systems of the United States
Ground radars
Military vehicles of the United States
Military electronics of the United States
Air traffic control